KRename is a KDE software that can be used for renaming multiple files and directories at one time. Many Linux distributions that use Plasma as the default desktop environment include the KRename software.

Features 
 Rename both files and directories
 Rename all files in a directory recursively
 Ignore hidden files when renaming
 Case change: to UPPERCASE, to lowercase or Only The First Letter
 Add prefix or postfix to filenames
 Search and replace parts of filenames (regular expressions are supported)
 Add ordered numbers to filenames (start, steps, skips definable)
 Change owner and permission of files
 Change access and modification date & time of files
 Deliver the renamed files to newly created directories. (files per directory, numbering format of directories definable)  
 Extract ID3 info from MP3/ogg files
 Extract Exif info from image files
 Add the current date and time to a filename
 Change file extensions
 Undo renaming
 Manual renaming of desired files
 Konqueror, Krusader, Dolphin integration
 Use JavaScript scripting
 Transliterate

External links
 The KRename KDE Userbase Wiki
 The source-code via SourceForge (old)
 The source-code via GitLab (current)
 The Official KDE informational page

References

Free file managers
Free software programmed in C++
KDE software